Acrotriche rigida is a low growing shrub in the family Ericaceae which grows in "intricately branched and matted clumps" and is endemic to New South Wales.

Description
Acrotriche rigida is a robust, densely branched shrub, which grows up to 1.5 m high with a corresponding diameter.

The leaves are stiffly spreading and lanceolate (6–11 mm long, 1–1.6 mm wide) and have strongly recurved margins. The leaf itself is whitish, with marked veins (3-5) deeply grooved on the lower surface; petiole 0.8–1 mm long.

The green flowers are usually 4–7 per spike, and have bracteoles which are about 1–1.5 mm long. The sepals 1.4–2.8 mm long and the corolla tube is 2.5–3.5 mm long with lobes 1–1.8 mm long.  The plant flowers from July to September.

The ovary has 4-5 compartments and the creamy green fruits are depressed-globose, with a flat top, are about 2.5–3 mm diameter, and are covered in short white hairs, creamy-green.

It is found in dry sclerophyll forest or in scrub on sandstone or granite slopes.

References

External links
 The Australasian Virtual Herbarium – Occurrence data for Acrotriche rigida
 Benson, D., & McDougall, L. (1993) Ecology of Sydney plant species. National Herbarium of New South Wales, Royal Botanic Gardens Sydney. pdf
 Google images: Acrotriche rigida

rigida
Flora of New South Wales
Taxa named by Robert Brown (botanist, born 1773)
Plants described in 1960